Maiwut is a city in Maiwut County in Upper Nile, South Sudan.

Located at the very border between Ethiopia and South Sudan, Maiwut boasts and sits next to some of the historical places in Southern Sudanese struggle, like the Bilpham SPLA military headquarter, The Itang and Punyido refugees camps, the Bonga military training camps etc.

References

Populated places in South Sudan